Hayyim ben Jacob Abulafia (born 1660 in Hebron, died 1744 in Tiberias, Ottoman Syria) was a rabbinical authority. He was the grandfather of Hayyim ben David Abulafia and grandson of Isaac Nissim aben Gamil. Abulafia was a rabbi in Smyrna, where he instituted many wholesome regulations. In his old age (1740) he restored the Jewish community in Tiberias.

He is the author of several works:
 "Mikrae Kodesh" (Holy Convocations), Smyrna, 1729, containing treatises on Biblical and Talmudical themes;
 "Yosef Lekach" (Increase of Learning), Smyrna, 1730–32, a work in three volumes on the Pentateuch;
 "Yashresh Ya'akob" (Jacob Will Take Root), Smyrna, 1729; and
 "Shebut Ya'akob" (The Captivity of Jacob), Smyrna, 1733, an elaborate commentary on the haggadic compilation "'Ein Yaakov," by Jacob ibn Habib and others.

References 

 Its bibliography:
 Steinschneider, Cat. Bodl. col. 820.

1660 births
1744 deaths
17th-century rabbis from the Ottoman Empire
18th-century rabbis from the Ottoman Empire
Rabbis in Hebron
Sephardi rabbis in Ottoman Palestine
People from Tiberias
Burials at the Old Jewish Cemetery, Tiberias
Rabbis in Ottoman Galilee